Dumri subdivision is an administrative subdivision of the Giridih district in the state of Jharkhand, India.

History
Dumri subdivision was created in March 2014.

Subdivisions
Giridih district is divided into the following administrative subdivisions:

Police stations
Police stations in Dumri subdivision have the following features and jurisdiction:

Blocks
Community development blocks in Dumri subdivision are:

Education
Given in the table below (data in numbers) is a comprehensive picture of the education scenario in Giridih district.:

Educatiional institutions
The following institutions are located in Dumri subdivision:
Parashnath Mahavidyalaya was established at Isri Bazar in 1985. Affiliated to Vinoba Bhave University it offers bachelor’s courses in arts, science and commerce.
Jharkhand College was established at Dumri in 1985. It is affiliated with Vinoba Bhave University. It offers courses in arts, science and commerce.

External links

References

Sub-divisions in Giridih district